Plebiscites were held on June 18, 1940 in the Philippines to ratify the following amendments to the Constitution: the extension of the tenure of the President and the Vice-President to four years with reelection for another term; the establishment of a bicameral Congress of the Philippines, with the Senate as the upper house and the House of Representatives as the lower house; and the creation of an independent Commission on Elections composed of three members to supervise all elections and plebiscites.

Results

On creating a bicameral legislature

Summary

By province/city

On having president and vice president re-elected

Summary

By province/city

On creating a Commission on Elections

Summary

By province/city

See also
Commission on Elections
Politics of the Philippines
Philippine elections

External links
 Official website of the Commission on Elections

1940 in the Philippines
1940 referendums
Constitutional referendums in the Philippines
Presidency of Manuel L. Quezon